Augustine "Gus" Joyce (born 10 August 1974) is an Irish cricketer born at Dublin. A right-handed batsman and wicket-keeper, he played three times for the Ireland cricket team in 2000, a first-class match against Scotland and matches against Italy and Scotland in the European Championship.

Family
Joyce is one of nine children of James "Jimmy" and Maureen Joyce. Other members of his family have played cricket much more for Ireland. Brothers Dominick and Ed have also played for Ireland, with Ed also playing for England. His sisters Cecelia and Isobel have played for the Irish women's team. His mother Maureen was a cricket scorer. She was also scorer in two WODIs in 2002 when New Zealand women toured to Netherlands and Ireland.

References

1974 births
Living people
Irish cricketers
Cricketers from Dublin (city)
Gus